Andrea Bussmann (born 1980) is a Canadian film director and screenwriter, most noted for her 2018 film Fausto. The film was longlisted for the Directors Guild of Canada's Discovery Award in 2018, and was shortlisted for the Vancouver Film Critics Circle's award for Best Canadian Film at the Vancouver Film Critics Circle Awards 2018. Bussmann was also shortlisted for Best Director of a Canadian Film.

She is married to film director Nicolás Pereda, with whom she codirected the 2016 film Tales of Two Who Dreamt.

References

External links

1980 births
21st-century Canadian screenwriters
Canadian women film directors
Canadian women screenwriters
Living people
Film directors from Toronto
Writers from Toronto